William Brown Stansbury (March 18, 1923 – April 4, 1985) was an American lawyer and politician who held the office of the Mayor of Louisville, Kentucky from 1977 to 1982.

Life
He served as an Army Air Corps pilot in World War II in the 457th Bomb Group.

Before serving as mayor, Stansbury had previously served 2 terms as a member of the Louisville Board of Aldermen. Stansbury became unpopular for being out of town with a woman during a firefighters' strike in 1978 and was the object of an impeachment attempt in 1979. Stansbury and his mother, Aileen Stansbury, were killed on April 4, 1985, while crossing the 1900 block of Bardstown Rd. in Louisville on their way to church. Stansbury's wife was also injured. Stansbury was interred at Calvary Cemetery on Newburg Road in Louisville.

William B. Stansbury Park at the intersection of S. 3rd St. and Eastern Parkway is named in his honor.

References

External Links

1923 births
1985 deaths
Kentucky city council members
Mayors of Louisville, Kentucky
Pedestrian road incident deaths
Road incident deaths in Kentucky
20th-century American politicians
United States Army Air Forces pilots of World War II